Hippocrateaceae Juss. previously consisted of about 150 tropical and subtropical species of shrubs and lianes, and is now included in the family Celastraceae. Formerly it comprised the following genera:
 Anthodon
 Apodostigma
 Arnicratea
 Baequaertia
 Campylostemon
 Cheiloclinium
 Cuervea
 Elachyptera
 Helictonema
 Hippocratea
 Hylenaea
 Loeseneriella
 Peritassa
 Prionostemma
 Pristimera
 Reissantia
 Salacia
 Salacighia
 Salaciopsis
 Semialarium
 Simicratea
 Simirestis
 Thyrsosalacia
 Tontelea
 Tristemonanthus

Celastraceae
Rosid families
Historically recognized angiosperm families